The Batavia Institute is a Registered Historic Place in Batavia, Illinois, US.

Batavia Institute 
Batavia Institute, a private academy, was chartered on 12 February 1853 by 13 men, including Rev. Stephen Peet, the Congregational minister, Elijah Shumway Town, Joel McKee, John Van Nortwick, Dennison K. Town, who settled in Batavia in 1839 as its first physician, and Isaac G. Wilson.

The building's central part, which still stands in Batavia at 333 South Jefferson Street, at Union Avenue, was constructed in 1853–1854 of locally quarried limestone at a cost of $20,000. The architect Elijah Shumway Town designed the building in a Greek Revival style.

Proposed normal school 
Bids were opened by the State Board of Education in Peoria on 7 May 1857. The first proposition on the agenda was from Batavia, which offered a subscription of $15,000, with the land and building belonging to the Batavia Institute, valued at $30,000, making $45,000 in all. Washington, in Tazewell County, Bloomington, and Peoria submitted proposals, as well.

National Register of Historic Places 
The building was listed in the National Register of Historic Places on 13 August 1976.

Notes 

1853 establishments in Illinois
Buildings and structures in Batavia, Illinois
Buildings and structures in Kane County, Illinois
Defunct hospitals in Illinois
Defunct schools in Illinois
Educational institutions established in 1853
Educational institutions disestablished in 1867
Hospitals established in 1867
Hospitals disestablished in 1965
National Register of Historic Places in Kane County, Illinois
School buildings completed in 1854
Tuberculosis sanatoria in the United States
School buildings on the National Register of Historic Places in Illinois